Hagg or Haggs may refer to:

Hagg
Hägg, Swedish surname
Arthur Ernest Hagg (1888–1985), British aircraft and boat designer
Eric Hagg (born 1989), former American football safety
Fox Hagg, a nature reserve in Sheffield
Robert Hagg (born 1995), Swedish ice hockey player
Russell Hagg (born 1938), Australian designer and director
Levitt Hagg, largely abandoned hamlet in South Yorkshire, England
Henry Hagg Lake, artificial lake in northwest Oregon, United States
Ḥaǧǧ: Hajj, annual Muslim pilgrimage to Mecca

Haggs
Haggs, village in Falkirk, Scotland
Haggs Castle, 16th-century tower house, Pollokshields, Glasgow, Scotland
Sea Haggs, 1990s Australian indie rock band

See also
 Hag (disambiguation)